LDA City is a housing estate located within union council 146 (Kahna Nau) in Nishtar Tehsil of Lahore, Punjab, Pakistan.

References

Further reading
 
 
 
 

Nishtar Town